WHEH-LD (channel 41) is a low-power television station serving Charlotte, North Carolina, United States. Its nominal city of license is Lumberton, North Carolina (in the Florence, South Carolina market), but its signal does not reach that area. WHEH-LD is owned by INNOVATE Corp. alongside WVEB-LD (channel 22). WHEH-LD's transmitter is located in northeast Mecklenburg County.

Subchannels
The station's digital signal is multiplexed:

References

External links
DTV America

 
 

Low-power television stations in the United States
Innovate Corp.
HEH-LD
Television channels and stations established in 2016
2016 establishments in North Carolina
LX (TV network) affiliates